Bird of Paradise is a 1932 American pre-Code romantic adventure drama film directed by King Vidor and starring Dolores del Río and Joel McCrea. Based on the 1912 play of the same name by Richard Walton Tully, it was released by RKO Radio Pictures.

In 1960, the film entered the public domain in the United States because the claimants did not renew its copyright registration in the 28th year after publication per the Copyright Act of 1909.

Plot
As a yacht sails into an isolated tropical island chain somewhere in the  Pacific Ocean, a large number of islanders in outrigger canoes paddle out to greet it. The islanders dive for trinkets the yacht's crew throws them.   A shark arrives, setting off a panic as much with the crew as the islanders. Johnny Baker (Joel McCrea) attempts to catch it hand casting with a large hook, but is yanked overboard when a loop of line attached to the impaled shark cinches around his ankle. Comely native swimmer Luana (Dolores del Río) cuts through the rope with a knife she had earlier been thrown as a trinket, saving his life.

At a welcome banquet that night, Johnny sees young island men ritually carry off young maidens, and seeks to do the same with Luana, but is stopped and castigated by the local chieftain, her father. With brief nudity and underwater swimming scenes, they swiftly fall in love. Later, the yacht moves on, but leaves Johnny on the island for an adventure. He discovers Luana has been promised to another man – a prince on a neighboring island. She is spirited away to this island for the  arranged marriage, while Johnny is waylaid. During an elaborate dance sequence, Johnny has made his way to the island in the nick of time, runs into a circle of fire, and rescues her as the natives kneel to the fire. Johnny and Luana then travel to another island where they hope to live out the rest of their lives. He builds her a house with a roof of thatched grass. However, their idyll is smashed when the local volcano on her home island begins to erupt. She confesses to her lover that her sacrifice alone can appease the mountain. Her people take her back. When Johnny goes after her, he is wounded in the shoulder by a spear and tied up. The people decide to sacrifice both of them to the volcano, but on the way, the couple are rescued by Johnny's friends and taken aboard the yacht.

Johnny's wound is tended to, but his friends wonder what will become of the lovers. Luana does not fit into Johnny's world. When Johnny is sleeping, Luana's father demands her back. She goes willingly, believing that only she can save her people by voluntarily throwing herself into the volcano.

Cast (in credits order)

 Dolores del Río as Luana
 Joel McCrea as Johnny Baker
 John Halliday as Mac
 Richard "Skeets" Gallagher as Chester
 Bert Roach as Hector
 Lon Chaney Jr. (billed as Creighton Chaney) as Thornton 
 Wade Boteler as Skipper Johnson
 Reginald Simpson as O'Fallon

Production

Director King Vidor, under contract to M-G-M, was loaned to RKO producer David Selznick (son-in-law to Louis B. Mayer) to make the “South Seas” romance. Filmed on location in Hawaii, Vidor and writer Wells Root arrived on the island territory and began shooting background footage without a completed script (Actors McCrea and del Rio were delayed due to engagements on other projects,) .

The native dance sequences were boom-shot in Hollywood and choreographed by an uncredited Busby Berkeley.

Bird of Paradise was almost the first sound film to utilize a full symphonic score from beginning to end. Producer David O. Selznick and composer Max Steiner had both been experimenting with this idea, while other studios had begun development along similar lines, such the score by Alfred Newman  for Samuel Goldwyn's Street Scene. However, it was Steiner who first received screen credit for composition of a score which, other than a few brief pauses during the film, was almost entirely through-composed (from beginning to end).

Reception

Bird of Paradise created a scandal after its release owing to a scene which appeared to show Dolores del Río swimming naked. She was, in fact, wearing a flesh-coloured G-string. The film was made before the Production Code was strictly enforced, so brief nudity in American movies was not unknown. Film director Orson Welles said del Río represented the highest erotic ideal with her performance in the film.

Box Office
The film lost an estimated $250,000 at the box office.

The film is recognized by American Film Institute in these lists:
 2002: AFI's 100 Years...100 Passions – Nominated

Theme

In the early 1930s, Hollywood produced a number of pictures that exploited popular interest in “exotic” tropical locations, though these regions were fully penetrated by Western culture by the early 20th Century, including Hawaii.
Films of this genre ranged from elevated ethnological studies such as F.W. Murnau’s and Robert Flaherty's Tabu: A Story of the South Seas (1931) to the Tarzan adventure series and King Kong in 1932 and 1933.

Vidor presents this “tragic” romance as a clash between modern “civilization” and a sexual idyll enjoyed by Rousseauian-like Noble savages. The sexual promiscuity and eroticism exhibited in Bird of Paradise is a measure of the as yet unenforced prohibitions of the Breen Office with its “nude swimming...lovers hanging from bamboo poles trying to kiss and Doloros del Rio sucking an orange, then transferring the juice to McCrea's fevered mouth.”

Though the American (McCrea) and his Hawaiian lover (del Rio) attempt to transcend the racist and sexual strictures that doom their relationship, Vidor, although not personally a racist, ended the film with what some interpret as  an anti-miscegenation message. Selznick's story line that “climax[s] with the girl tossed into a volcano” is both an example of the producer's predilection for tragic melodrama and, as seen by some, a Vidorian “tongue-in-cheek” cautionary tale concerning the fate of racially mixed couples.

Footnotes

References
 Baxter, John. 1976. King Vidor. Simon & Schuster, Inc. Monarch Film Studies. LOC Card Number 75-23544.
 Durgnat, Raymond and Simmon, Scott. 1988. King Vidor, American. University of California Press, Berkeley.

External links

  
 
 
 
 
 

1932 films
1930s romance films
1932 adventure films
American romantic drama films
American adventure drama films
American black-and-white films
Films about interracial romance
Films set in Oceania
Films set on islands
RKO Pictures films
Films directed by King Vidor
Films produced by David O. Selznick
Films scored by Max Steiner
Indigenous films
Articles containing video clips
Films with screenplays by Wanda Tuchock
American films based on plays
1930s English-language films
1930s American films